Alan Mills  (born Albert Miller; September 7, 1912 or 1913 – June 14, 1977 ) was a Canadian folksinger, writer, and actor. He was best known for popularizing Canadian folk music, and for his original song, I Know an Old Lady Who Swallowed a Fly. He appeared on several radio and television programs and in movies.

Career
As a young man, Mills worked as a newspaperman.  He left this work in about 1940 and took a job in radio. He hosted a show for CBC radio on which he played Canadian folk music.

Mills began singing and recording traditional music from Canada, accompanying himself on guitar. His first album, Let's Sing a Little, was released by RCA Victor. He composed the classic folk song I Know an Old Lady Who Swallowed a Fly (with lyrics by Rose Bonne)  which was later recorded by Burl Ives, Peter Paul and Mary and many others. He published a book, The Alan Mills Book of Folk Songs and Ballads, in 1949.  His recordings of authentic traditional music were reviewed by Oscar Brand in the Saturday Review of Music, and included in a number of folk music compilation albums.

Mills was signed to take part in tour of the United States in 1960, and that year performed at the Newport Folk Festival.

He was made a Member of the Order of Canada in 1974 for his contributions to Canadian folklore.  Mills has also released several albums on Folkways Records of Canadian and French folk songs.

Discography

n.d.
"Chansons a Boire'
[Venus VL 301]

Notes

External links
Discography for Alan Mills on Folkways
"Alan Mills, Collaborator and Friend" by Edith Fowke, Canadian Folk Music Bulletin 30.3 (1996)

1910s births
1977 deaths
People from Lachine, Quebec
Members of the Order of Canada
Canadian folklorists
Canadian folk singers
Canadian songwriters
Musicians from Montreal
Writers from Montreal
20th-century Canadian male singers